The 1997 Memorial Cup occurred May 10–18 at the Robert Guertin Centre in Hull, Quebec.  It was the 79th annual Memorial Cup competition and determined the major junior ice hockey champion of the Canadian Hockey League (CHL).  Participating teams were the host Hull Olympiques, who were also the champions of the Quebec Major Junior Hockey League, as well as the QMJHL runner-up Chicoutimi Saguenéens, and the winners of the Ontario Hockey League and Western Hockey League, which were the Oshawa Generals and the Lethbridge Hurricanes respectively.  The round-robin portion of the tournament also featured one of the greatest games in Memorial Cup history, in which Lethbridge trailed Hull 6-1 to start the third period of their game and stormed back to win 7-6 in overtime.  The Olympiques won their first Memorial Cup, over Lethbridge.

Round-robin standings

Scores
Round-robin
May 10 Oshawa 5, Chicoutimi 3
May 11 Lethbridge 4, Chicoutimi 2
May 11 Hull 8, Oshawa 0
May 13 Lethbridge 7, Hull 6 OT
May 14 Oshawa 2, Lethbridge 1
May 15 Hull 8, Chicoutimi 5

Semi-final
May 17 Lethbridge 5, Oshawa 4 OT

Final
May 18 Hull 5, Lethbridge 1

Winning roster

Scoring leaders
Christian Dube, Hull 6-7-13
Donald MacLean, Hull 2-6-8
Pavel Rosa, Hull 3-4-7
Martin Menard, Hull 5-1-6
Frederic Bouchard, Chic 2-4-6
David Gosselin, Chic 3-2-5
Denis Hamel, Chic 2-3-5
Mike Josephson, Leth 2-3-5
Marc Savard, Osh 0-5-5
Jonathan Delisle, Hull 0-5-5
Byron Ritchie, Leth 2-2-4

Goaltending leaders
Statistics to be added

Award winners
Stafford Smythe Memorial Trophy (MVP): Christian Dube, Hull
George Parsons Trophy (Sportsmanship): Radoslav Suchy, Chicoutimi
Hap Emms Memorial Trophy (Goaltender): Christian Bronsard, Hull
Ed Chynoweth Trophy (Top Scorer): Christian Dube, Hull

All-star team
Goal: Christian Bronsard, Hull
Defence: Chris Phillips, Lethbridge; Jan Snopek, Oshawa
Forward: Christian Dube, Hull; Martin Menard, Hull; Byron Ritchie, Lethbridge

References

External links
 Memorial Cup 
 Canadian Hockey League
Mastercardmemorialcup.ca Video
NHL.com video

Mem
Memorial Cup tournaments
Ice hockey competitions in Ottawa